Tri Songdetsen was the son of Me Agtsom, the 38th emperor of Tibet. He ruled from AD 755 until 797 or 804. Tri Songdetsen was the second of the Three Dharma Kings of Tibet, playing a pivotal role in the introduction of Buddhism to Tibet and the establishment of the Nyingma or "Ancient" school of Tibetan Buddhism.

The empire Tri Songdetsen inherited had declined somewhat from its greatest extent under the first Dharma King, Songtsen Gampo. Disintegration continued when, in 694, Tibet lost control of several cities in Turkestan and, in 703, Nepal broke into rebellion. Meanwhile, Arab forces vied for influence along the western borderlands of the Tibetan empire. Nevertheless, Tri Songdetsen became imperial Tibet's greatest ruler and an unparalleled Buddhist benefactor.

Tri Songdetsen and his support for Buddhism

Tri Songdetsen is very important to the history of Tibetan Buddhism as one of the three 'Dharma Kings' (Tibetan:chögyel) who established Buddhism in Tibet. The Three Dharma Kings were Songtsen Gampo, Tri Songdetsen, and Ralpacan.

The Skar-cung pillar erected by Sadnalegs (ruled c. 800-815) says that during the reign of Tri Songdetsen, "shrines of the Three Jewels were established by building temples at the centre and on the borders, Bsam-yas in Brag-mar and so on". The first edict of Tri Songdetsen already mentions a community of monks at Bsam-yas (Samye), consisting of the former army.

Indian traditions
Songdetsen became emperor in 755, at the young age of 13. His conversion to Buddhism took place in 762 at age 20. In post-imperial sources, is claimed to have invited Padmasambhava, Śāntarakṣita, Vimalamitra, and various other Indian teachers to come to Tibet to spread the latest understanding of the teaching.  The two pandits began by establishing Samye as the first vihara in Tibet.  Several Tibetans were eventually initiated as monks and a vast translation project was undertaken translating the Buddhist scriptures from Sanskrit into Classical Tibetan. Yeshe Tsogyal, previously either the consort or wife of Tri Songdetsen, became a great master after studying with Padmasambhava, and is considered the Mother of Buddhism.

Chinese traditions
The first documented dissemination of Chan Buddhism to Tibet, chronicled in what has become known as the Statements of the Sba Family, occurred in about 761 when Tri Songdetsen Detsen sent a party to the Yizhou region to receive the teachings of Kim Hwasang, a Korean Chan master, who they encountered in Sichuan. The party received teachings and three Chinese texts from Kim, who died soon after.

Tri Songdetsen patronised a second party to China in 763. This second expedition was headed by a high minister, Sba Gsalsnan. There is scholarly dissent about whom Gsalsnan encountered in Yizhou. Early scholarship considered Kim, but this had been revised to Baotang Wuzhu (714-774), head and founder of Baotang Monastery in Chengdu. Both Kim and Baotang Wuzhu were of the same school of Chan, the East Mountain Teaching.

Debates

Tri Songdetsen, hosted a famous two-year debate from 792-794, known in Western scholarship as the "Council of Lhasa" (although it took place at Samye at quite a distance from Lhasa) outside the capital. He sponsored a Dharma debate between the Chan Buddhist Moheyan, who represented the third documented wave of Chan dissemination in Tibet, and the scholar Kamalaśīla, a student of Śāntarakṣita. Effectively the debate was between the Chinese and Indian Buddhist traditions as they were represented in Tibet.

Sources differ about both the nature of the debate as well as the victor. Stein (1972: p. 66-67) holds that Kamalaśīla disseminated a "gradualist approach" to enlightenment, consisting of purificatory sādhanā such as cultivating the pāramitās. Kamalashila's role was to ordain Tibetans as Buddhist monks and propagate Buddhist philosophy as it had flourished in India.  Stein (1972: p. 66-67) holds that Kamalaśīla was victorious in the debate and that Tri Songdetsen sided with Kamalaśīla.

Stupa construction
Tri Songdetsen is also traditionally associated with the construction of Boudhanath  in the Kathmandu Valley in Nepal.

The role of Padmasambhava on the other hand was to establish the teaching of Buddhist Tantra in Tibet.  During the reign of Tri Songdetsen the combined efforts of Padmasambhava, Śāntarakṣita and Kamalaśīla established both the Indian Buddhist philosophical interpretation and Buddhist tantra in Tibet.

Political and military activities
In 763 Tri Songdetsen sent an army of 200,000 men to the border with Tang China, defeating the forces there and then continuing on to take Chang'an, the Tang Chinese capital, forcing Emperor Daizong of Tang to flee the capital. In 783 a peace treaty was negotiated between China and Tibet giving Tibet all lands in present-day Qinghai.

The King also formed an alliance with Nanzhao in 778, joining forces to attack the Chinese in Sichuan.

Tri Songdetsen next sought to expand westward, reaching the Amu Darya and threatening the Abbasid Caliph, Harun ar-Rashid. The Caliph was concerned enough to establish an alliance with the Chinese emperor. Tri Songdetsen Detsen would be preoccupied with Arab wars in the west, taking pressure off his Chinese opponents to the east and north, until his rule ended in 797.

Retirement, death and succession
Tri Songdetsen had four sons: Mutri Tsenpo, Muné Tsenpo, Mutik Tsenpo, and Sadnalegs. The eldest son, Mutri Tsenpo, died early.

Tri Songdetsen retired to live at the palace at Zungkar and handed power to his second son, Muné Tsenpo, in 797. From this point there is much confusion in the various historical sources. It seems there was a struggle for the succession after the death of Tri Songdetsen. It is not clear when Tri Songdetsen died, or for how long Mune Tsenpo reigned. The Testament of Ba, a Tibetan historical text which may date back to the 9th century, claims that Muné Tsenpo insisted that his father's funeral be performed according to Buddhist rather than traditional rites.

It is said that Mune Tsenpo was poisoned by his mother, who was jealous of his beautiful wife.

Whatever the case, both the Old Book of Tang and the Tibetan sources agree that, since Mune Tsenpo had no heirs, power passed to his younger brother, Sadnalegs, who was on the throne by 804 CE.

The other brother, Mutik Tsenpo, was apparently not considered for office as he had previously murdered a senior minister and had been banished to Lhodak Kharchu near the Bhutanese border.

References 

Tibetan emperors
Buddhist monarchs
8th-century rulers in Asia
8th-century Tibetan people
Nyingma
8th-century births
Date of birth unknown
Date of death unknown
8th-century Buddhists